San Narciso is a village in Corozal District, Belize. At the time of the 2010 census its population was 2,422.

References

Populated places in Corozal District